Alice Maria Ottley (1882–1971) was a botanist, author, assistant professor and curator of the herbarium at Wellesley College. She collected and studied American flora, particularly species of Lotus, and publishing books and articles on botany.

Biography 
Ottley was born on the 20th of November 1882 to Bell Mariah Ferguson and her husband Clarence Ottley. In September 1919 Ottley was appointed the Assistant Professor of Botany at Wellesley College. Ottley was educated at Cornell University and the University of California at Berkeley, where she earned her PhD in 1921 under the direction of Willis Linn Jepson. She was an Exchange Professor for several months in 1925 at the University of Witwatersrand, South Africa. Ottley served as curator of the Wellesley Herbarium from 1922 to 1930 before becoming Department of Botany chairman. Ottley was elected a member of Sigma Xi in June 1938. In 1939, she resigned from the faculty to travel and work with her aunt, the botanist Margaret Clay Ferguson.

In 1999 the plant genus Ottleya was named in her honour as a result of her being the first to describe the group, undertaking an important revision of its species and drew the attention to the flower symmetry as a taxonomic character in Papilionaceae-Loteae.

Publications 

Ottley, Alice M. (1918) A Contribution to the Life History of Impatiens sultani Botanical gazette 66(4) 289–317.

Ottley, Alice M. (1938) The Occurrence of Centipeda minima in Wellesley, Massachusetts Rhodora 40, 219–220.

References 

1882 births
1971 deaths
20th-century American botanists
20th-century American women scientists